Islamabad is located in the Pothohar Plateau in the northern part of Pakistan, within the Islamabad Capital Territory. Islamabad is a well-organized city divided into different sectors and zones. It was ranked as a Gamma world city in 2008. The city is home to Pakistan Monument, it is built on top of a hill in a park and Faisal Mosque, the largest mosque in South Asia and the sixth largest mosque as per area in the world.

Islamabad has seen large-scale development and infrastructure projects in the 21st century. In 2023, the most prominent projects are;

 Margalla Avenue
 11th Avenue
 10th Avenue
 Bhara Kahu Bypass
 IJP Road reconstruction
 Islamabad Expressway Expansion
 Blue Area Expansion

Completed developments

Margalla Avenue

The 11 km Margalla Avenue aka Khayaban-e-Margalla runs along the foothills of Margalla Hills and connects Sector B-17 (Sangjani on G.T. Road) to Sector D-12 and E-11 (11th Avenue and Khayaban-e-Iqbal Road). It is a 6-lane road 15m wide on each side. The project was completed at a cost of Rs1.8 billion.

Capital Development Authority prepared PC-I of the project in 2008 with a spirit to protect the green image of the Margalla Hills National Park. Construction started in 2017 and the road was opened for public in 2022. It facilitates the travelers heading towards Islamabad from the Northern parts of the country to reach the heart of the city within 10 minutes. It also facilitates those who have to commute daily from areas like Taxila, Wah Cantt, Hassan Abdal, Haripur to various parts of the federal capital.

IJP Road Reconstruction 
The 10 km long 2-lane Inter-Junction Principle Road was converted to a signal free 5-lane road having 2 bridges (9th Avenue and Faqir Aipi Road) and 1 interchange (10th Avenue).

This road divides Rawalpindi and Islamabad and is mostly used by Heavy vehicles. Project's cost was 4.9 Billion PKR. Work started in mid 2021, and completed in March 2023.

New Islamabad International Airport

The New Islamabad International Airport was completed in 2018. This airport in Islamabad replaced the existing Islamabad International Airport. This new airport is located in Fateh Jang, which is 25 km west of the city. Construction of the airport project began in April 2007 and completed in May 2018.

Metro Bus Rapid Transit System (BRTS)

The Red Line of Rawalpindi-Islamabad Metrobus is a  BRT line that serves the twin cities of Rawalpindi and Islamabad in Pakistan. It uses dedicated bus lanes for all of its route covering 24 bus stations. It was inaugurated on 4 June 2015 by Prime Minister Nawaz Sharif becoming the second fully functional BRT service in Pakistan after the BRTS in Lahore. Orange Line was inaugurated in 2021 which connects Islamabad city center to Islamabad Airport. Blue and Green Lines were started in 2022 on dedicated routes by Shehbaz Sharif.

Islamabad Expressway

Islamabad Expressway or Faisal Avenue (named after Saudi King Faisal), is one of the main highways of Islamabad, Pakistan that connects it to Rawalpindi. It stretches from Faisal Mosque (on northern end) to Rawat (on southern end) linking to GT Road  with a length of about 28 kilometers. It initially had 3 lanes on each side but was later expanded to 5 lanes on each side in 2015 due to ever increasing traffic. It has many interchanges, most important ones being Jinnah Avenue, Zero Point Interchange and Faizabad Interchange, Khanna Bridge, Old Airport, Gulberg, DHA, T-Chowk. The expressway was further widened from Gulberg to T-Chowk in 2022-23.

Peshawar Mor Interchange
Peshawar Mor is the intersection between 9th Avenue and Kashmir Highway. A cloverleaf interchange on this intersection was made in 2016 to ease traffic congestion and reduce waiting times due to traffic signals. This interchange also has a metrobus station underground. Passport Office and Sunday Market are nearby.

Zero Point Interchange

The Zero Point Interchange is the cluster of flyovers and roads adjacent to Zero Point on one side and Islamabad Highway on the other side. It was built by Maqbool Associates at a cost of Pak.Rs 2.33 billion. The construction work was started in 2007 and was completed in December 2010. The zero point interchange was constructed in two phases. Phase 1 included the three major loops of the interchange. In Phase 2, two more loops which will connect Khayaban-e-Suhrawardy and Shakarparian were constructed.

The Centaurus

The Centaurus is a mixed-use residential, commercial, and business purpose complex located in Blue Area of Islamabad. The complex is designed by WS Atkins PLC, whose portfolio includes the Burj Al Arab and Jumeirah Beach Hotel in Dubai, and the Bahrain World Trade Center in Bahrain. It is a project of the Pak Gulf Construction (Pvt) Ltd (PGCL) in Islamabad.

Islamabad Stock Exchange Towers

The ISE Towers are a recently completed office building in Islamabad. Islamabad Stock Exchange or ISE was the youngest of the three stock exchanges of Pakistan and is located in the capital of Pakistan. Islamabad stock exchange (ISE) was incorporated as a guarantee-limited company on 25 October 1989 in Islamabad. ISE tower is a 22-storey building, which makes it the second highest building of Islamabad after the Telecom Tower. Area covered by the building is 562,629 sq ft (52,269.9 m2), it consists of three levels of basements and ground plus 18 floors above

Telecom Tower
Telecom Tower is a 113-meter-high office building built in 2009 in the Blue Area of Islamabad. It was built by Pakistan Telecommunication Trust. The building consists of 24 floors plus four basement levels and includes a parking facility for 400 cars.

World Trade Center 

The World Trade Center, Islamabad project was launched in March 2007 and located in the heart of Phase-II of Defence Housing Authority, Islamabad. It is facing the G.T. Road and includes a shopping mall that has a Carrefour, along with a hotel. It opened in August 2016.

Other 
 Daman-e-Koh
 Development of Fatima Jinnah Park and Lake View Park
 Renovation of Shrine of Bari Imam
 Development of Saidpur Village
 Development of Judicial & Administration Complex, Sector G-10
 Renovation of Food Street at Melody Market
 Food Mall at Blue Area
 Development of Malpur Village
 Development of Pak-China Friendship Centre
 Development of Charah Dam

Developments under construction

Bhara Kahu Bypass
Work on Bhara kahu bypass started in 2022 and would complete in 2023. It had to be built due to ever increasing traffic and congestion. People who wanted to go north for tourism faced hours of traffic jams. Work is undergoing 24/7 at fast pace. There was an incident that a girder fell as it was unstable and 2 people lost their lives. Safety protocols were increased on site after this incident.

11th Avenue
11th Avenue had to be built because people coming to Islamabad via Margalla Avenue would have no where to go but enter residential sectors of D-12 and E-11. This is because land near Margalla Hills belongs to Pakistan Army and Margalla Avenue could not be extended upto Faisal Mosque. Existing roads surrounding the sectors were of 2 lanes only. A 6-lane signal free Avenue starting from E-11 is being built with a major interchange at Kashmir road and IJP road. Project would complete by late-2024.

10th Avenue

Construction on 10th Avenue started in 2022 and would complete by 2024. It would connect IJP Road to sector E-10 and have a great interchange at the intersection of Kashmir Highway. It would be 6-lane 8 km long avenue with 3-lane service roads on both sides. It would greatly improve Rawalpindi-Islamabad connectivity.

Blue Area Extension
Blue Area is the largest commercial area in Islamabad on both sides of the Jinnah Avenue. Extension of Blue Area is underway with many high-rise buildings under construction between sectors G-8 and F-8, G-9 and F-9 Park.

Canyon Views (Emaar)

Canyon Views by real-estate developer Emaar was launched in May 2006. Located in DHA Phase-5, it offers a luxurious villa-community spanning over an area of 100 acres (6 km2).

This mixed-use development (residential, commercial, leisure, and retail) consists of three projects valued at Rs. 145 billion (US$2.4 billion). The Canyon views upon completion will include swimming pools, gymnasium, sports amenities, running track, tennis court, open spaces for picnics and barbecues, retail outlets, restaurants, schools, and a mosque.

The views will include 50 communities in it, and when fully completed it will have homes for 9,000 families. Phase 1 of the project has been completed and sold out while Phase 2 is still under construction.

One Constitution Avenue
One Constitution Avenue project is located at the southern end of the Constitution Avenue on a 13.5-acre (55,000 sq m) site (6.75 hectares) and is connected to two major highways (Kashmir Highway to the northwest and Murree Road to the southwest).

The development consists of a 45-story 5-star hotel (Grand Hyatt), Serviced apartments tower (One CASA), Two 20-storied residential towers (Residences) and a shopping mall (Mall One). Construction of the 20 story residential twin towers is complete. Twin towers are linked together by means of a bridge at the 20th floor, aligned with the axis of the Constitution Avenue. Other towers of the project are under construction. Other features of the project include retail and food courts, banquet and multistory carpark.

Kingdom Valley Islamabad
Kingdom ValleyKingdom Valley is a housing society developed & designed by Kingdom group developers. Smart city feature housing project offers Residential & commercial plots & categorized by different General & Executive Blocks. This Housing Society comes under the Naya Pakistan Housing Program (NPHP). There are no second thoughts about the fact that this housing society project has been providing a lot more than people’s expectations.

Proposed and Future developments

Rawalpindi Ring Road 
This is a 39 km Ring Road in planning stages since 2015. It will start from Banth on N-5 and terminate on Thalian on M-2. It will have 5 interchanges. Heavy vehicles would be bound to use the Ring Road hence reducing traffic on the existing Peshawar Road. This is a greater extension of the under construction Sialkot-Rawalpindi Motorway of Pakistan. Funds were released in March 2023. Project is expected to complete in 2 years once construction starts.

Layi Expressway 
Layi Expressway would be built along the Nalah Layi in Rawalpindi. This 17 km 3-lane expressway is in planning stages since 2015. This project would improve connectivity within different areas of Rawalpindi. Encroachments will have to be removed on both sides of the river. Work might commence by January 2023 and complete by December 2024. It would be a 25 km 3 lane expressway with 3 interchanges.

Rawalpindi-Murree Expressway 
Kohsar Tourism Expressway project is a 123 km planned expressway which connect Rawalpindi to Murree via Kallar Syedan, Kotli Sattiyan and Kahuta.

Project would cost PKR 4.5 billion and would be constructed in 2 years. The expressway will boost tourism and help open up massive investment and commercial opportunities for the region’s local and international tourist industries.

Housing schemes 
Islamabad Capital Territory is subdivided into five zones, and the development work is in progress for the following residential and commercial projects;

Zone I

 Sector C-15 (Under construction)
 Sector C-16
 Sector C-17
 Sector D-11
 Sector D-12 (Fully developed)
 Sector D-13
 Sector D-14
 Sector D-15
 Sector D-16
 Sector D-17 (Under construction)
 Sector D-18 (Under construction)
 Sector E-7 (Fully developed)
 Sector E-8 (Fully developed)
 Sector E-9 (Fully developed)
 Sector E-10 (Margalla Hills)
 Sector E-11 (Fully developed)
 Sector E-12 (Under construction)
 Sector E-13
 Sector E-14
 Sector E-15
 Sector E-16 (Under construction)
 Sector E-17 (Under construction)
 Sector E-18 (Under construction)
 Sector F-5 (Fully developed)
 Sector F-6 (Fully developed)
 Sector F-7 (Fully developed)
 Sector F-8 (Fully developed)
 Sector F-9 (Fatima Jinnah Park)
 Sector F-10 (Fully developed)
 Sector F-11 (Fully developed)
 Sector F-12
 Sector F-13
 Sector F-14
 Sector F-15 (Fully developed)
 Sector F-16
 Sector F-17 (Fully developed)
 Sector F-18 (Fully developed)
 Sector G-5 (Fully developed)
 Sector G-6 (Fully developed)
 Sector G-7 (Fully developed)
 Sector G-8 (Fully developed)
 Sector G-9 (Fully developed)
 Sector G-10 (Fully developed)
 Sector G-11 (Fully developed)
 Sector G-12
 Sector G-13 (Fully developed)
 Sector G-14 (Fully developed)
 Sector G-15 (Fully developed)
 Sector G-16 (Under construction)
 Sector G-17
 Sector H-8 (Fully developed, Dedicated for universities)
 Sector H-9 (Fully developed, Dedicated for universities)
 Sector H-10 (Fully developed, Dedicated for universities)
 Sector H-11 (Fully developed, Dedicated for universities)
 Sector H-12 (Fully developed, Dedicated for universities)
 Sector H-13
 Sector H-14
 Sector H-15
 Sector H-16
 Sector H-17 (Under construction)
 Sector H-18, EIGHTEEN project being developed by an Egyptian Real Estate Group.
 Sector I-8 (Fully developed)
 Sector I-9 (Fully developed)
 Sector I-10 (Fully developed)
 Sector I-11 (Fully developed)
 Sector I-12 (Under construction)
 Sector I-13 
 Sector I-14 (Fully developed)
 Sector I-15 (Under construction)
 Sector I-16 (Under construction)
 Sector I-17
 Sector I-18

Zone-II

 Sector E-15,
 Sector F-15, Jammu and Kashmir Cooperative Housing Society
 Sector G-15, Jammu and Kashmir Cooperative Housing Society
 Sector D-16, Engineers Housing Scheme
 Sector E-16, Cabinet Division Housing Society && Roshan Pakistan (RP) Housing Society
 Sector F-16, Jammu and Kashmir Cooperative Housing Society
 Sector G-16, Ministry of Interior Employees Co-operative Housing Society
 Sector G-17, Supreme Court Employees Cooperative Housing Society
 Sector A-17, Multi Professional Cooperative Housing Society (MPCHS) - Multi Gardens
 Sector B-17, Multi Professional Cooperative Housing Society (MPCHS) - Multi Gardens
 Sector C-17, New Islamabad Garden
 Sector D-17, Margalla View Housing Scheme (MVHS)
 Sector E-17, Cabinet Division Housing Society
 Sector F-17, Multi Professional Cooperative Housing Society (MPCHS) - Tele Gardens
 Sector F-18, Faisal Town 
 Sector B-18, Multi Professional Cooperative Housing Society (MPCHS) - Multi Gardens
 Sector D-18, Army Welfare Trust
 Sector D-18, Engineers Cooperative Housing Societies (ECHS) Islamabad
 Sector E-18, Gulshan-e-Sehat

Zone-II Extension

 Islamabad Orchards, Multi Professional Cooperative Housing Society (MPCHS)

Zone-III

Consists of Margalla Hills National Park.

Zone-IV

 Park Enclave, Islamabad
 PHA Kuri Road Housing Project
 Bahria Enclave Islamabad
 Lake View Lanes, Islamabad

Zone-V
 DHA Islamabad
 DHA Valley Islamabad
 Bahria Town, Islamabad
 Naval Anchorage, Islamabad

Model towns

In 1985, Capital Development Authority declared several outlying areas of Islamabad as 'model villages' to ease the housing problem. These model villages are as follows:

 Farash Town
 Humak Town
 Margalla Town
 Rawal Town
 Shahzad Town

See also

 Bahria Town
 Islamabad International Airport
 Capital Development Authority
 Emaar Properties
 InterContinental
 List of tallest buildings in Pakistan
 List of tourist attractions in Islamabad
 Benazir Bhutto International Airport

Faisal Town Islamabad==References==

Islamabad
Urban planning in Pakistan